Aristaea acares is a moth of the family Gracillariidae. It is known from Tasmania, Australia.

References

Aristaea
Moths described in 1939